Wali is a surname. Notable people with the name include:

Aminu Bashir Wali (born 1941), Nigerian politician
Kameshwar C. Wali (1927–2022), Indian-American theoretical physicist
Najem Wali (born 1956), Iraqi novelist and journalist
Sima Wali (1951–2017), Afghan activist
Taj Wali (born 1991), Pakistani cricketer
Wali Mohammed Wali (1667–1707), Indian classical Urdu poet
Yousef Wali (1930–2020), Egyptian politician

See also
Wali (given name)